The sixth cabinet of Milo Đukanović was the cabinet of Montenegro from 4 December 2012 to 28 November 2016. It was a coalition government composed of centre-left Coalition for a European Montenegro (DPS and SDP) and national minority parties. Split in the ruling DPS-SDP coalition in January 2016, leaving the government functioning as a de facto minority government. The Cabinet was functioning as the provisional government (of electoral trust),
from 12 May to 28 November 2016, with several Ministers from opposition parties joined the government.

Government formation

2012 election

Elections for the composition of new parliament of Montenegro were held on October 14, 2012 and resulted in a new victory for the ruling Coalition for a European Montenegro led by Democratic Party of Socialists (DPS) of former PM Milo Đukanović, which has been in power since introduction of multi-party system in 1990.

Forming majority
Although the Coalition for a European Montenegro failed to win the majority on its own, they succeeded in remaining in power once again, forming a government with the national minority parties.

The sixth cabinet of Milo Đukanović was elected on December 4, 2012, by the parliament of Montenegro. The governing coalition was formed by Coatition for a European Montenegro members Democratic Party of Socialists and Social Democratic Party and national minorities parties Bosniak Party and Croatian Civic Initiative, which run independently.

Cabinet composition

Political crisis, 2015-16

In 2015, the investigative journalists' network OCCRP named Montenegrin Prime Minister Milo Đukanović "Person of the Year in Organized Crime". The extent of Đukanović's corruption led to street demonstrations and calls for his removal.

Opposition protests
A political crisis in Montenegro was initiated by the opposition Democratic Front (DF) which staged protests requesting fair elections and transitional government. DF organised continuous protests in October 2015 which culminated in a large riot in Podgorica on 24 October.

DPS-SDP split
On January 27, 2016, a parliamentary vote saw the split of the ruling DPS and up until then coalition partner SDP. This followed a failed crisis talk over the organization of the "first free and fair election". The President of the National Assembly Ranko Krivokapić (SDP) strongly criticized Prime Minister Milo Đukanović and the ruling party (DPS). With the split of SDP, Đukanović lost the Assembly majority. Đukanović started an initiative to remove Krivokapić from the seat. A split in the ruling coalition followed in January 2016, leaving the government functioning as a de facto minority government.

Government confidence voting
On 27 January 2016, despite formerly being an opposition party, Positive Montenegro (PCG) provided the ruling DPS with 3 votes necessary to win the government confidence vote, after the junior partner SDP left the government due to allegations of electoral fraud and political corruption, therefore forming a new ruling majority. Following this vote, national media and other opposition parties accused PCG for deceiving and betraying its voters in order to save Prime Minister Đukanović. In turn, in June 2016 Darko Pajović (PCG) was appointed as the President of the Parliament, position formerly held by Ranko Krivokapić (SDP), and held the position until October 2016.

Provisional government
The provisional government of electoral trust was elected on May 12, 2016, by the parliament of Montenegro. The provisional governing coalition was formed by DPS and several opposition parties.

See also
Milo Đukanović
Government of Montenegro

References

Government of Montenegro
Cabinets established in 2012
2012 establishments in Montenegro